Rhizocarpic acid is an organic compound with the molecular formula C28H23NO6 which has been isolated from the lichen Rhizocarpon geographicum and other lichens.

References

Further reading 

 
 

Lichen products
Biological pigments
Amides
Furanones
Methyl esters